Muriqui may refer to:

Muriqui or woolly spider monkeys, monkeys of the genus Brachyteles
Muriqui, Mangaratiba, a neighborhood in the Brazilian city Mangaratiba-RJ
Muriqui (footballer), nickname of Luiz Guilherme da Conceição Silva, Brazilian footballer